Warsaw metro station A-16 Muranów is a proposed and planned Warsaw Metro station. It was included in the original plans, however it was temporarily dropped in 1989 due to budget constraints. As of 2009 this station is in hiatus - it is listed as a planned investment, but the last official update regarding its status dates to 2006. The proposed location of the station in the Muranów neighbourhood (crossroads of Anielewicza and Andersa streets), 635 meters to the north of A-15 Ratusz Arsenał and 899 meters to the south of A-17 Dworzec Gdański.

Proposed Warsaw Metro stations